Dunbia, founded in 1976 as Dungannon Meats and headquartered in Dungannon, Northern Ireland, is a red meat processor that sources and manufactures beef, lamb and pork products for retail, commercial and foodservice markets locally, nationally and internationally.

Information
Ten abattoirs collectively employ 3,200 staff at Dungannon, Ballymena, Preston, Northern Ireland, Sawley, Northern Ireland, Llanybydder, Nantmel, Kilbeggan, Slane, Maganey and Elgin. Dunbia is devoted to improving the environment aspect of the company and they are currently working to environmental management systems throughout all the Dunbia sites.

History
The history of Dunbia is as follows:
2020 - Dawn Meats take full control of the business
2017 - Dunbia enter joint venture with Dawn Meats in the UK
2014 - Acquires Lynch Quality Meats in Ayr, Scotland
2013 - Opens factory facilities in Felinfach, Wales
2013 - Acquires G Wood & Sons, Mansfield
2011 - Takes over Heathfield Foods Ltd in Crewe, England
2009 - Acquires Stevenson's & Co Pork Facility in Cullybackey, Northern Ireland
2007 - Acquires Rhinds of Elgin in North East of Scotland
2007 - Acquires Kepak in Preston, England
2006 - Group rebranded to become ‘Dunbia’
2006 - New European sales office opened in Paris
2003 - Acquired a new boning facility for Dunbia (Kilbeggan)
2001 - Dunbia (Kilbeggan) acquired along with sister company Dunbia (Slane)
2001 - Dunbia (Llanybydder) acquired from Oriel Jones & Sons
1998 - Dunbia (Sawley) acquired from Rose County Foods
1996 - Major extension doubling the capacity of Retail Packing Factory at Dungannon
1993 - Built a retail packing factory at Dungannon
1990 - Opened extensive new boning facility at Dungannon
1985 - Built slaughter facility at Dungannon
1983 - Moved to new boning facility at Dungannon
1976 - Opened butchers shop in small village near Dungannon

References

Companies of Northern Ireland